State Company for Internet Services (also known as URUKLINK) is an Iraqi internet service provider (ISP). It was founded in 1999, and was the sole ISP in Iraq until 2003.

External links
 Uruklink
 Internet Troubleshooting

Internet in Iraq
Communications in Iraq